Dr. V. S. Krishna Govt. Degree & P.G College is an Autonomous college established in 1968 inaugurated by Khandubhai Kasanji Desai Governor of Andhra Pradesh.

Institution
This college is NAAC A grade for Krishna College and under & post graduation courses are offered here.

References

External links
 

Colleges in Andhra Pradesh
Universities and colleges in Visakhapatnam
Colleges affiliated to Andhra University
Educational institutions established in 1968
1968 establishments in Andhra Pradesh